The Ordre des Palmes Académiques (Order of Academic Palms) is an order of knighthood of France for academics and cultural and educational figures. The early Palmes académiques was instituted on 17 March 1808 and was only awarded to teachers or professors.  In 1850 the decoration was divided into two known classes:
Officier de l'Instruction Publique (Golden Palms)
Officier d'Académie (Silver Palms)

Since 1955 the Ordre des palmes académiques has comprised three grades:
Commandeur (Commander) — medallion worn on necklet
Officier (Officer) — medallion worn on ribbon with rosette on left breast
Chevalier (Knight) – medallion worn on ribbon on left breast

In 1866, the scope of the award was widened to include major contributions to French national education and culture made by anyone, including foreigners. It was also made available to any French expatriates making major contributions to the expansion of French culture throughout the world.

The following is an incomplete list of foreign recipients of the Ordre, with sources of information as indicated:

Armenia
Chevalier
Marie Lou Papazian (2019), CEO at Tumo Center for Creative Technologies
Aram Barlezizyan (2006), Armenian academic specialising in the French Language.

Australia
Officier
 Evelyn Temple Emmett (1923), 'Father of Tasmanian Tourism'.
 Henry Tardent (1929), Swiss-born journalist and writer
His Honour Judge Warren C Fagan, QC (2006), former president of the Administrative Appeals Tribunal of Victoria, former president de L'alliance Francaise de Melbourne, chevalier de Légion d'Honneur
Chevalier
Edward Duyker (2000), Australian historian of French voyages to the Indian Ocean and Pacific in the eighteenth and early nineteenth centuries.
Jane Zemiro (2000), Australian academic and author.
 Gretchen Bennett (2002), Australian teacher of the French language.

Azerbaijan
Officier
 Vazeh Asgarov (2021), earned the degree of doctor at the University of Strasbourg (2012), the executive director at French-Azerbaijani University (UFAZ) (from 2016).

Belgium
Officier 
Derrick Gosselin (2015) Member of the Royal Academy of Belgium.

Belarus
Officier
 Vladimir Perlin (2003) – cellist, professor
Chevalier
 Galina Toumilovitch Charco (2004), formerly dean of Languages at European Humanities University, Minsk

Brazil
Chevalier
João Cruz Costa, Brazilian philosopher who taught in France after temporarily fleeing the military dictatorship in Brazil.
Marilena Chauí (1992), Brazilian philosopher, professor at Universidade de São Paulo.

Canada
Chevalier
Roseann Runte (1985), vice-chancellor and president of Carleton University
Charles Gonthier (1988), Puisne judge of the Supreme Court of Canada.
Dyane Adam (1998), Canadian Govt Official Languages Commissioner responsible for promoting bilingualism.
Robert (Robin) Inglis (1988) Maritime Historian, Director of the Vancouver Maritime Museum.
A.J.B. Johnston (2008), historian
Edward Langille (2004), professor of Modern Languages at St. Francis Xavier University.
 (2013), professor of French Studies, University of Winnipeg
Guy Berthiaume (2015), Librarian and Archivist of Canada at Library and Archives Canada
Linda Cardinal (2013), political scientist
Donald Ipperciel (2017), professor of philosophy
Lace Marie Brogden (2019), Dean – Faculty of Education, St. Francis Xavier University

Colombia 
Chevalier

 Belisario Ruiz Wilches (1937), engineer, astronomer, geographer, and founder of the Geographic Institute Agustín Codazzi

Costa Rica 

Officier
 Arturo Agüero Chaves (1963), philologist
 Victor Brenes Jiménez (date unknown), philosopher

Croatia
Commandeur
Guido Nonveiller (1989), entomologist and professor of the University of Belgrade.

Denmark
Chevalier
Asta Mollerup (1930s), modern dance teacher and director of the Danserindeskole (Girls Dancing School) in Copenhagen
Marie-Louise Nosch, archaeologist specialising in prehistoric textiles

Egypt
Commandeur
Hussein Sobhy (1977), Mayor of Alexandria (1952–1966) and founder of the Biennale of Alexandria in 1954.

Chevalier 
Sherif Delawar (2012), Thinker in Economic Development and Visiting Professor of managerial Sciences.

Finland
Commendeur
 (1984)
Marja-Riitta de la Chapelle (1986)
Jarmo Anttila (1988)
Christoffer Taxell (1988), politician
Heikki Kirkinen (1992)
 (1996)

Raija Kallinen

Chevalier
Tuomo Melasuo (2002), professor in Tampere Peace Research Institute

Gambia
Chevalier
Saihou Bah (2002) Principal French teacher (Alliance Francaise) and Promoter of French culture
Commandeur
Sedat Jobe (....) Former Minister, Former UN officer, Lecturer at Dakar University (UCAD)

Germany
Chevalier
Iring Fetscher (1993), academic, political scientist and professor of the Goethe University Frankfurt.

Greece
Chevalier

 Konstantinos (Kostis) Katsakioris (2016) Creator of the Exhibition "50 ans Asterix" with French Institute of Greece & Archaeological Museum of Thessaloniki
Dionysis Simopoulos (2006), director of Evgenidio Foundation Planetarium.
 Eugenia Bezirtzoglou (2006), professor of microbiology, Medical School, Democritus University of Thrace

Officiers

 Eugenia Bezirtzoglou (2017), 
Professor of Microbiology, Medical School, Democritus University of Thrace

India
Chevalier
Y. K. Sohoni (1975), professor at Poona University and CIEFL, Hyderabad; founder, Indian Association for French Teachers (1953).
Manohar Rai Sardesai (1988), Konkani poet and translator.
Neelima A. Raddi (1992), professor Fergusson College, Pune; translator;  co-author of En Échanges ( first Indian textbook for French); student of Prof. Y.K. Sohoni.
Govindan Rangarajan (2006), professor, Department of Mathematics, Indian Institute of Science (IISc).
Sampat Kumar Tandon (2009), geologist, former Pro-vice chancellor of Delhi University, Shanti Swarup Bhatnagar laureate.
Chinmoy Guha (2010), Bengali intellectual, author, translator and professor of Calcutta University.
Basabi Pal (2016), Associate Professor of French in West Bengal Education Service at Chandernagore College (Formerly College Dupleix), West Bengal.
Nalini J.Thampi (2022), Professor of the Department of French at Pondicherry Central University, Puducherry and English and Foreign Language University, Hyderabad.

Officier
Kalya Jagannath Rao (2006), physical chemist, Shanti Swarup Bhatnagar laureate.

Iran
Commandeur
Ali-Akbar Siassi, Iranian intellectual, psychologist and politician during the 1930s and 1960s, government minister and Chancellor of Tehran University.

Chevalier

Ahmad Kamyabi Mask, professor of Fine Arts in the University of Tehran during the 1980s and 1990s, writer, translator, publisher and scholar of French avant-garde theatre, influential in the study of Eugène Ionesco and Samuel Beckett.
Javad Tabatabai, thinker and historian of Iranian modernity.
Siamak Yassemi, professor of Mathematics at the University of Tehran.

Ireland
Officier
Henri O'Kelly, organist, choir director, music teacher
Janie McCarthy,  resistance worker during World War II in Paris, and language teacher

Chevalier
 James J. Browne, former President of NUI Galway
 Michael O'Dwyer, Head of Dept of French, Maynooth University, for his services to French Literary Studies. 
 John Ringwood (2017), professor of Electronic Engineering in Maynooth University, for his contributions to marine renewable energy
 Louise Curtin (2017), teacher at Belvedere College, Dublin for her contribution to French debating
 Tony Lewis (2017), professor of Energy Engineering in University College Cork, for his contributions to marine renewable energy

Israel
Commandeur
Itamar Rabinovich, president of Tel Aviv University

Officier
Menachem Banitt, Tel Aviv University
Yirmiyahu Yovel, Hebrew University of Jerusalem, founder of International Spinoza Institute

Chevalier
Hossam Haick, Technion - Israel Institute of Technology

Ivory Coast
Officier
 Jacqueline Oble

Kenya 
Chevalier
 Dorothy Wanja Nyingi, Head of Ichthyology, National Museums of Kenya

Lebanon
Raymonde Abou, Director (1965–1999), Collège Louise Wegmann.
Tiba Geha-Villard (2008), Director (2000–present), Collège Louise Wegmann.
Chafic Maalouf, Lycee Franco Libanais 1977
Khalil Chalfoun (2019), Rector (2017–present), Université La Sagesse

Lesotho
 'Masenate Mohato Seeiso (2018), Queen consort of Lesotho (2000–present)

Malawi
Chevalier
Boston Jaston Soko, African Literature (1990), University of Malawi.

Mexico
Efraín Huerta (1945), Mexican poet.
 Luz María Arteaga Machorro (2007), educator and founder of CESSA Universidad.

Monaco
Commandeur
Albert II of Monaco (2009).

Namibia
Buddy Wentworth, politician, for his contributions to the Namibian independence struggle.

Netherlands
Officier
 Dolf Unger (1933), Rotterdam art dealer.
Chevalier
 Wim Meulen (1938)

New Zealand
Commandeur
Alec Goldsmith (2002), Polish-born RAF pilot and French language teacher who settled in New Zealand in 1961, for 22 years of organising exchanges with New Caledonian students.
Ian Scott Laurie (1983), New Zealand-born professor of French at Flinders University and president of South Australian Alliances Francaises (appointed Officier in 1972).
Keith Val Sinclair, New Zealand-born academic and professor of French at the James Cook University, North Queensland.

Officier since 1955 and Officier de l'Instruction Publique (Golden Palms) prior to 1955
Walter Lawry Buller  (1887), New Zealand politician, naturalist and ornithologist who was New Zealand Commissioner at the Colonial and Indian Exhibition in 1886.
Percival Clay Neill, vice-consul for France 1878 to 1921.
Frank Wild Reed (1934), translator, literary critic, biographer and devotee of Dumas; reaffirmed after appointment as Officier in 1927.
William Marshall MacDonald (1947), president of the Wellington French Club (later Alliances Francaises).
John Dunmore (1986), New Zealand academic, author on French history in the Pacific and long-time president of the New Zealand Federation des Alliances Francaises.
Elizabeth Goulding (1991), New Zealand academic for her services to French language and culture
Glynnis Cropp (2011), New Zealand academic, committee member of the Federation of the Alliances Francaises in New Zealand since 1981. Appointed Chevalier in 1991.

Chevalier since 1955 and Officier d'Académie (Silver Palms) before 1955
Walter Kennaway CMG (1889), New Zealand politician, secretary to New Zealand High Commissioner London and representative at the 1889 Paris World fair and exhibition.
Edward Robert Tregear (1896), New Zealand academic and politician, co-founder of the Polynesian Society.
Edwin John Boyd-Wilson (1924), New Zealand academic and professor of Modern Languages at Victoria University, Wellington.
James McRoberts Geddis (1926), author, journalist and editor of New Zealand Free Lance.
M. M. Ifwersen (1934), president of the Mercantile Auxiliary Club and host of French warship visits to Auckland.
Frederick Fisher Miles (1930s), New Zealand academic, professor of mathematics at Victoria University, Wellington, and president of the Cercle Française 1929–35.
Allwyn Charles Keys, professor emeritus of French and Romance Philology at Auckland University and president of the Auckland French Club from 1943 to 1968.
 Lloyd Ernest Upton (1977).
 Mervyn Fairgray (1979), deputy principal Auckland Grammar School.
 Frances Huntington (1979).
Jim Hollyman (1980), New Zealand academic at Auckland University for "services to French language and culture".
 Fred Woodward Marshall (1980), New Zealand academic at Waikato University for "services to French language and culture".
 Peter John Norrish (1980), New Zealand academic for "services to French language and culture".
David Bancroft (1981), New Zealand academic at Canterbury University for "services to French language and culture".
Raymond Gladstone Stone (1981), New Zealand academic for "services to French language and culture".
Richard Goldsmith (1982).
Cyril Peacock (1982).
Graham Halligan (1984), New Zealand academic for "services to French language and culture".
Ashley Day (1989), founded New Zealand National Association of French Teachers in 1986 and represented New Zealand at the World Congress of French Teachers in 1987.
Jacqueline Ferry (1990), senior lecturer in the French Department of the School of European Languages and Literature at Victoria University of Wellington.
Peter Morrow (1990).
Peter Low (1990), New Zealand academic at Canterbury University for "services to French language and culture".
Maurice Andre (1991).
Tony Angelo (2003), Victoria University Law School professor with a long involvement at the Université de la Polynésie française (UPF).
Barbara Dineen (2005), teacher at Columba College, Dunedin for "services to French language and culture" over a long period of time.
Denis Fouhy (2005), Rotorua French teacher and organiser of exchanges with the College Jean Marrotti in Nouméa, New Caledonia.
Jean Anderson (2006), chair of the French Department at Victoria University of Wellington.
Marie Brown (2006), teacher of French and French literature from 1977 and especially president of the Alliances Francaises of Wellington from 2002 to 2004.
Brian McKay (2006), former head of the University of Auckland's French department and current vice-president of the Alliance Française d'Auckland.
Rosemary Arnoux (2007), Auckland University senior lecturer European Languages and Literature.
Peter Tremewan (2007), New Zealand academic at Canterbury University for "services to French language and culture".
Danielle Fillion (2010), president of the Waiheke French Club, in recognition of her efforts in promoting French culture.
Stephanie Barnett (2010), a highly valued member of the community of French language teachers in New Zealand since 1981.
Warren Henderson (2019) for services rendered to French culture.

Niger
 Commandeur
 Mariama Hima, Nigerien ambassador in France in 1996–2003.

Norway
Officier
 Asbjørn Aarnes (1984), Norwegian literary historian, professor at the University of Oslo.
 Valborg Aschehoug, Norwegian chemical engineer, bacteriologist at Hermetikkfabrikkens laboratorium in Stavanger.
 Ambrosia Tønnesen, the first professional female sculptor in Norway

Pakistan
 Ahmad Hasan Dani (1990), archaeologist.
 Azra Quraishi (2002), botanist.
 Abdul Hafeez Mirza (2015), Tourism worker, author, educationist and cultural activist.

Portugal
Chevalier
Elísio Brandão (2000), economist at the University of Porto and Porto Business School; Rossas-born politician, now president of the Municipal Assembly of Arouca.

Philippines
Sotero Laurel (1986), Filipino politician and educator who served as a senator from 1986 until 1992.
Emerita S. Quito, Filipino philosopher, professor emeritus and University Fellow at De La Salle University-Manila
Leovino Ma. Garcia, Filipino philosopher

Romania
Chevalier

 Emil Ceangă (2004), professor at the "Dunărea de Jos" University of Galați
George Poede (2016), professor at the Alexandru Ioan Cuza University in Iasi.

Russia
Chevalier
Lyudmila Ulitskaya (2003), critically acclaimed modern Russian novelist and short-story writer.
Officier
Shubina Elena (2016), professor, doctor of chemical sciences, head of the Laboratory of Metal Hydrides, INEOS RAS.

Saudi Arabia
Hatoon al-Fassi (2008), women's rights activist and assistant professor of Women's History at King Saud University.
 Mohamed BEN LADEN (2008), Support and Promotion of the French Culture Lawyer and Chairman of MBL Law Firm

Serbia
Dušan T. Bataković, historian and diplomat
Milena Dragićević Šešić, culturologist and university professor

Slovenia
Avrelija Cencič (2008), professor of the University of Ljubljana, researcher, manager and educator in health and life sciences.
Andrejka Lorenčak (2021), professor of the First High School in Celje

South Africa
Officier
Marie-Joséphine Whitaker (1985), Professor, University of the Witwatersrand, co-founder of the Association of French Studies of Southern Africa

Sudan 

 Ahmed H. Fahal (2018), Professor of Surgery at the University of Khartoum, who especially in Mycetoma.

Sweden
Officier d'Académie
Svante Forsberg (1911), Ciseleur d’art Fontenay-aux-Roses
Officier
Per Magnus Johansson (2006), psychoanalyst, psychotherapist and historian of ideas; associate professor of the University of Gothenburg
Chevalier
Christophe Premat (2014), Swedish resident and French deputy for Northern Europe
Dr. Anna Sjöström Douagi (2017), Founder of The Young Academy of Sweden and Vice President Science and Programs Nobel Prize Center

Tanzania
Officier
Sospeter Muhongo, member of parliament and geologist.

Thailand 
Chevalier
 Somboon Pichayapaiboon (1979), Science Educator and Chemistry Professor, Ministry of Education. A founder of Technical Chemistry program for Vocational Education of Thailand.

Officier
 Associate Professor Dr. Kittichai Triratanasirichai (2018), President of Khon Kaen University, Thailand.

Togo
Commandeur
Paul Ahyi (1985), Togolese artist, sculptor, architect, painter, interior designer and author.

Turkey
Commandeur
Cahit Arf (1994), Turkish mathematician.
Tahsin Yücel (1997), Turkish translator, novelist, scholar

Chevalier
Fatih Birol (2006), chief economist and director of Global Energy Economics at the International Energy Agency.
Misel Tagan (2015), French teacher.
Yomtov Garti (1964), Turkish mathematician and teacher

Ukraine
 Anatoliy Mazaraki (2006) — Ukrainian scientist, rector of the Kyiv National University of Trade and Economics, Doctor of Economics, professor, academician of the National Academy of Educational Sciences of Ukraine.

United Kingdom
Officier de l'Instruction Publique
Sir Thomas Elliott, 1st Baronet, civil servant

Commandeur
Peter Bayley (2006), Drapers Professor of French at the University of Cambridge and fellow of Gonville and Caius College, Cambridge 
Richard Cooper (2012), professor of French and fellow of Brasenose College, Oxford.
Christina Howells, (2015), professor of French and fellow of Wadham College, Oxford.
Ann Jefferson (2012), professor of French at the University of Oxford
Douglas Johnson (1987), professor of French history at University College London
Helena, Baroness Kennedy of The Shaws (2006), barrister, broadcaster and parliamentarian.
Richard J. Parish, (2012), professor of French and fellow of St Catherine's College Oxford.
Alan Raitt (1995), professor of French literature at the University of Oxford and Fellow of Magdalen College, Oxford

Officier
Wendy Ayres-Bennett (2004), British linguistics scholar
C. W. L. Bevan (1986), Welsh chemist and academic.
Maud (M. A.) Cloudesley Brereton, social hygiene and domestic gas expert (1907).
Anthony G. Constantinides (Officier 1996, Chevalier 1985), British academic, Imperial College London
Michael Crawford (2001), British ancient historian and numismatist.
Norman Hartnell (1939), British fashion designer, dressmaker to HM The Queen and HM Queen Elizabeth The Queen Mother.
John Loughlin (2010), British academic and educator, a specialist in European territorial politics at Cambridge.
Basil Markesinis (1992), Anglo-Greek professor of European Law and director of the Institute of European and Comparative Law.
Paul Mellars (2004), professor of Prehistory and Human Evolution and fellow of Corpus Christi College, Cambridge.
David Parris (1994), Former Senior Lecturer in French and Fellow Emeritus of Trinity College, Dublin.
Roger Pearson (2005), professor of French and fellow of The Queen's College, Oxford.
Philip Thody (1982), professor of French at the University of Leeds.
Robert Spence (1995), Emeritus Professor of Information Engineering, Imperial College London.

Chevalier
Donald Adamson (1986), author, historian, biographer (of Pascal) and visiting fellow of Wolfson College, Cambridge.
James Platt, Director of the Central Bureau for Educational Visits and Exchanges, London.
Celia Britton (2003), British scholar of French Caribbean literature and thought
Herrick Chapman (2006), British historian.
Robert Fox (1988), British historian.
Sean Hand (2004), Deputy Pro-Vice-Chancellor (Europe), University of Warwick
Dr. Hall Kathleen Mary, Treasurer, Alliance Française, Librarian/Treasurer, Oxford & District Esperanto Society, Senior lecturer Renaissance French 
Rosalyn Higgins (1988), professor of International Law and president of the International Court of Justice.
Marian Hobson (1997), professor of French at Queen Mary, University of London
Gregory B. Lee (2010), British academic, author, broadcaster and professor of Chinese and Transcultural Studies at the University of Lyon (Jean Moulin)
John McManners (1991), Anglican clergyman and religious historian specialising in the history of the Church and other aspects of religious life in 18th-century France.
Huw Morris (2011), academic registrar, Swansea University 
Brian Stobie (2012), international officer, Durham County Council
Richard Gillingwater (2012), Dean of Bayes Business School (Formerly Cass Business School).
Julian Swann, professor of the University of London and expert on early modern France
Steve Wharton, University of Bath academic, social and cultural historian
Dougal Campbell (2017), lecturer at the University of Glasgow.

United States
Commandeur
Thomas E. Lovejoy, conservationist, ecologist, University Professor at George Mason University
Philip Werner Amram, lawyer and legal scholar, president of La Fondation de l'Ecole Francaise Internationale and legal adviser to the French Embassy.
John Kneller (1916–2009), English-American professor and fifth President of Brooklyn College
Harlan Lane, distinguished university professor of psychology at Northeastern University in Boston, Massachusetts.
Richard Morimoto, Bill and Gayle Cook professor of biology at Northwestern University in Evanston, Illinois
 Marie Philip Haley, CSJ, PhD, Professor of French at the College of St. Catherine, St. Paul, MN
Officier
Jane Robert, American educator and former president of the Federation of Alliances Françaises USA
Joseph Roger Baudier (1949), for his work as a Catholic church historian and columnist writing about the traditions of France in New Orleans
Mary Bonner, Texas etching print artist,
Arnold Davidson, professor of philosophy at the University of Chicago.
Jerry Hirsch (1994), professor of psychology and animal biology at the University of Illinois, Urbana-Champaign
Norris J. Lacy, American scholar focusing on French medieval literature
Pirie MacDonald, American portrait photographer, New York City civic leader, and peace advocate.
Jeffrey Mehlman (1994), professor of French Literature at Boston University.
Thaddeus Weclew,*  one of the creators of the Academy of General Dentistry.
 Dr. Jacquelyne Hoy (2010) Founder of Lycee Franco-Americain International School and International School of Broward
Erskine Gwynne (1936) Publisher of the Paris-based Boulevardier magazine

Chevalier
Benjamin Barber (2001), political theorist.
Leo Benardo (1973), Director of Foreign Languages, New York City School System
Guy Bennett (2005), American academic specialising in French literature.
Lee Bradley, (1996), emeritus assistant professor (French) at Valdosta State University (1967–1998, 2000–2012), Valdosta, GA; executive director of the Southern Conference on Language Teaching (1988–1999).
Theodore E. D. Braun, Emeritus Professor of French at the University of Delaware; founding member of the American Society for Eighteenth-Century Studies, the International Society for Eighteenth-Century Studies, the Ibero-American Society for Eighteenth-Century Studies, and the Society for Eighteenth-Century French Studies
Elizabeth Chaponot, Ph.D. (2009) Excellence in French Education, Head of School, Lycee International de Los Angeles
Herbert Clemone De Ley Jr, professor of French at the University of Illinois.
Olga Duhl (2015) Oliver Edwin Williams Professor of Languages, founder and Co-Chair of the Medieval, Renaissance, and Early-Modern Studies Program at Lafayette College, United States. An associate member of the Research Center, Textes et Cultures, Université de Bourgogne, Dijon, she is on the Editorial Board of the scholarly journal, Le Moyen français as its US correspondent, a Vice-President of the International Association for Middle French Studies, and a reviewer for Renaissance and Reformation/Renaissance et Réforme, and Literature and Theology. 
Richard Guidry (1995), Cajun cultural activist and educator who worked to save the French language in Louisiana.
James F. Jones, preceptor in the Department of French and Romance Philology at Columbia University, and chair of the Department of Foreign Languages at Woodward Academy in Atlanta.
Dorothy Donald (1966), professor of Spanish and French at Monmouth College (Illinois) for more than 40 years of service as a teacher of French. 
Henry Koffler (1977), president emeritus at University of Arizona. 
Francis L. Lawrence (1937–2013), classical drama and baroque poetry scholar, president of Rutgers University (1990–2002)
Joseph Lussier (1934), Québécois-American journalist, editor, and publisher who published La Justice, a French-language weekly in Holyoke, Massachusetts 
John A. Lynn, American military historian and lecturer at Northwestern University.
Joseph S. Nye, Jr., American political scientist and former dean of the John F. Kennedy School of Government at Harvard University.
Dr. Heather McCoy, professor of French at Penn State University 
Dr. Michael D. Oates (1939 - 2009), professor of modern languages at University of Northern Iowa. 
Dr. Paul D. Onffroy (1967), professor of foreign languages at Chico State College, Lieutenant Colonel US Army and Program Director USIS in Marrakech, Morocco.
Dr Michael Picone, professor of French and Linguistics at The University of Alabama
Dr. Deborah Reisinger (1969), professor of French at Duke University
Joëlle Rollo-Koster, professor of history at the University of Rhode Island
Richard Shusterman, American pragmatist philosopher, and professor of philosophy at Florida Atlantic University.
Alice Strange (2009), professor of French at Southeast Missouri State University. 
Dr. Joseph L. Tomchak (1988)
Jean Mirvil (2009), innovative principal of Public School 73 located in the Bronx, NYC, put in place a dual immersion French English program to address the needs of the Francophone population. 
Shimon Waronker (2009), headmaster of The New American Academy, PS 770, an innovative new public school in Brooklyn, New York.
Randall E. Westgren (2007), professor of agribusiness and entrepreneurship at the University of Illinois.
Cathy Yandell (2019), W.I. and Hulda F. Daniell Professor of French and Francophone Studies, Carleton College.
Dr. Elizabeth W. Poe (2016), professor of French medieval literature at Tulane University, New Orleans, LA.
Moira Judas Smith (2019), beloved French teacher and Wilson "Woody" Sims, Sr. Endowed Chair of World Languages at The Webb School, Bell Buckle, TN.  Her award was granted to her posthumously and was received by her daughter, Caroline Smith Pryor.
Dr. Jolene Vos-Camy (2021), professor of French at Calvin University in Grand Rapids, MI.

Vietnam
Chevalier

Notes

References